Prantik (Bengali: প্রান্তিক; English: The Borderland)  is a Bengali poetry book written by Rabindranath Tagore. It was published in 1938. It consists of 18 poems. It is a significant work in the final phase  of Rabindranath's poetry.

List of poems 
The 18 poems of "Prantik" are:

References

External links 

 Book on Bengali Wikisource (in Bengali)
 rabindra-rachanabali.nltr.org

Bengali poetry collections
Poetry collections by Rabindranath_Tagore
1938 poetry books
Works by Rabindranath Tagore
Indian_poetry_books